Mowgli: The New Adventures of the Jungle Book is a live action television series based on the Mowgli stories from the Rudyard Kipling novels, The Jungle Book and The Second Jungle Book.  A contemporary adaptation, the series has Mowgli joined on his adventures by a young American girl, named Nahbiri, who has accompanied her widowed doctor father to Jabalpur, India.  The show was created by Timothy Scott Bogart, Guy Toubes, and James Hereth and produced by Wolfcrest Entertainment and Franklin/Waterman Worldwide, and distributed internationally by Alliance Films. It premiered on the Fox Kids in the United States on February 7, 1998 and ran until August 1, 1998.

Episodes 
The single season had 26 episodes.

 Mowgli of the Seoni: Part 1 
 Mowgli of the Seoni: Part 2 
 A New Beginning 
 The Bigger Picture 
 Side By Side 
 What Goes Around
 Friend or Foe
 Circus Breaker
 The Perfect Shot 
 Song of Akela
 The Hollow Bird
 Fatherhood (1)
 Cold Lairs (2)
 RashomowglI
 Mowgli, P.I.
 Good Intentions
 Best Friends
 Life Lessons
 Outback and Back Out
 The Guardian
 Going to Extremes
 Paper Chase
 Feeling Trapped
 Run Like the Wind
 Return to Cold Lairs: Part 1
 Return to Cold Lairs: Part 2

References

External links

1990s American children's television series
1990s Canadian children's television series
1998 American television series debuts
1998 American television series endings
1998 Canadian television series debuts
1998 Canadian television series endings
American children's action television series
American children's adventure television series
American children's fantasy television series
American television shows based on children's books
Canadian children's action television series
Canadian children's adventure television series
Canadian children's fantasy television series
Canadian television shows based on children's books
Fox Kids
Fox Broadcasting Company original programming
Works based on The Jungle Book
Television series about orphans
Television series about bears
Television series about cats
Television series about wolves
Television series about tigers
Television shows set in India
Television series by Alliance Atlantis